Dust Muhammad (or Doust Muhammad) was a Persian painter of miniatures, calligrapher, and art historian, active from about 1510 to 1564. Later in life he worked in India.

Early career
Dust Muhammad was born in Herat in the late 15th century, although the date is not known. He was a disciple of Kamāl ud-Dīn Behzād, working with teachers in Herat. Prince Bahram Mirza first spotted his talent and invited him to work in his studio. By early 1520 Muhammad moved with Behzad from Herat to Tabriz. After the death of Shah Ismail I, he remained in the service of Shah Tahmasp I, taking part in the illustration of the famous Shahnameh of Shah Tahmasp, however his contribution is much more modest than that of Sultan Mohammed or Mir Musavvir. 

After the death of Behzad, Muhammad left the Tahmasp court. According to some researchers, he was a nomad and he could no longer sit in the same spot. In the late 1530s he worked at the court of the ruler of Kabul, Kamran Mirza, brother of the Mughal emperor Humayun.

India
In 1555, and at the invitation of the Emperor, he traveled to India. By about 1550 he had created a miniature on a separate sheet, created by order of the Mughal emperor - "The Emperor Humayun and his brothers in a landscape". The interior of this piece is styled Turkmen Sultan Muhammad.  Much of it takes the form of grotesque mountain elephants and other animals (especially loved by Shah Tahmasp). The emperor Humayun sits on a stone throne, and in the distance under the trees play three boys, one of whom is the future Emperor Akbar I. 

In the early 1560s, the court of the Mughal emperors was already under Emperor Akbar I, and Dust Muhammad left India and returned to Iran. He lived out the last days in Qazvin. The exact date of his death is unknown.

Calligraphy
Dust Muhammad learned the art of calligraphy from a master Shadishaha Qasim, a student of the famous calligrapher of Herat Sultan Ali Mashhadi. From the pen of Muhammad came out excellent artistic calligraphic manuscripts and samples. Some of them are presented in the Russian National Library in St. Petersburg. For a long time Muhammad was the head of the Safavid royal court of Prince Bahram Mirza, a famous patron of the arts, but also the master of calligraphy, artist, musician and poet. Muhammad also worked for his brother Bahram Mirza - Shah Tahmasp I, and enjoyed the title of "Royal calligrapher". 

Dust Muhammad in the first chapter is known as the author of an essay on Persian painting. In the years 1544–45. He wrote a treatise on calligraphers and artists. This work is extant in the muraqqa of calligraphic designs and miniatures, known as the "Album of Bahram Mirza", which is stored in the library of the Topkapı Palace Museum in Istanbul.

The first nineteen sheets album as a preface is a treatise Dust Muhammad, written by beautiful handwriting, probably belonging to the author. In addition to the Treaty on the album are three more works Dust Muhammad - two miniatures with the caption "Master Dust" and calligraphic passage, signed "Douste-Muhammad Musavvir" (the artist).

Treatise written in the Persian language, includes an introduction to the origin of the letter, the head of the masters of handwriting "taʿliq" and "nastaʿlīq", a section on the history of art and its masters, and especially - the information about the court artists and calligraphers of Bahram Mirza. Despite the confusion of mythical and historical names, the history of painting the picture painted by Dust Muhammad is of considerable interest. His writing provides a clear allusion to the existence of a religious ban images of living beings, and at the same time on the relativity of this prohibition. In his treatise Muhammad does not touch any problems the art of painting, nor any of its equipment. The value of this work lies in the extensive knowledge of the life and work of Persian artists of the 14th to 16th centuries.

References
 Master the art of art. - M., 1965. - T. 1.
 Welch, Stuart Cary. Persian Painting Five Royal Manuscripts of the Sixteenth Century. - New York. 1976.
 Welch, Stuart Cary. Wonders of the Age. - Cambridge: Fogg Art Museum, Harvard University. 1979.
 Dickson M. B. / Welch S. C. The Houghton Shahnameh. - Cambridge, Mass. 1981. - Vol. 1.

Further reading
 

Persian miniature painters
People from Herat
16th-century Iranian painters